Robert Barnes may refer to:

Sportspeople
Robert Barnes (sportsman) (1911–1987), Irish cricketer and rugby union player
Robert Barnes (Australian footballer) (1896–1967), Australian rules footballer
Robert Barnes (footballer, born 1969), English footballer
Bob Barnes (baseball) (1902–1993), Major League Baseball pitcher
Bobby Barnes (born 1962), English footballer

Other people
Robert Barnes (attorney), American attorney
Robert Barnes (martyr) (1495–1540), English reformer
Robert Barnes (physician) (1817–1907), English obstetrician
Robert A. Barnes (1808–1892), businessman in St. Louis
Robert Henry Barnes (1849–1916), British–New Zealand chess player
Robert L. Barnes (born 1951), Canadian judge
Bob Barnes (cartoonist) (1913–1970), cartoonist
Bootsie Barnes (Robert Barnes, 1937–2020), jazz musician

Characters
Staff Sgt. Bob Barnes, a character in Platoon
Bob Barnes, George Clooney's character in the 2005 film Syriana

See also
Bert Barnes (disambiguation)